Philip Thomas may refer to:
 Philip E. Thomas (1776–1861), American railway executive
 Philip Francis Thomas (1810–1890), American legislator
 Philip J. Thomas (1921–2007), Canadian folklorist
 Philip Michael Thomas (born 1949), American actor
 Philip Thomas (cricketer) (born 1978), English cricketer
 Sir Philip Thomas (diplomat), British diplomat
 Phil Thomas (rugby), Welsh rugby union and rugby league footballer who played in the 1900s and 1910s
 Phil Thomas (footballer) (1952–1998), English footballer

See also
 Philippa Thomas (born 1965), British newsreader and journalist
 Phillip Thomas (born 1989), American footballer